L'Trimm was a Miami bass hip-hop duo composed of  Bunny D and Lady Tigra. Originally from Coconut Grove, Florida (origin neighborhood of the City of Miami), they recorded three albums for Atlantic Records: Grab It! in 1988 (which is certified Gold by the RIAA), Drop That Bottom in 1989 (which led The Source to name the group Hip-Hop Goddesses of the Month), and Groovy in 1991.

Group history
The group took its new name from a then-popular designer brand of blue jeans (Trim) and added the L' prefix to give it a French feel. The song "Grab It!" became a local hit and was followed by an album of the same name. Shortly after, "Cars With The Boom," an ode to subwoofers, reached No. 54 on the Billboard Hot 100, and a national tour followed. Atlantic Records picked up the group's first album, and signed a deal to distribute L'Trimm's second album, Drop That Bottom, which included a remix of "Grab It!" The album was only a minor success. Interest in "Cars With The Boom" was later renewed in mid-2020 due to the influence of TikTok.

L'Trimm became dissatisfied with the direction their music was taking, once co-writers were put in charge of producing their third album Groovy. At the same time, Miami indie labels began to speculate that the Miami bass sound would never break through to mainstream national audiences. As Hot Productions began to look for new creative inspiration, the group hired representation in the form of managers and lawyers. A stalemate was reached and the group abandoned the sessions of its third album, Groovy. With plenty of vocal outtakes left in the studio from previous sessions, Hot Productions continued creating the album without the artists' input. The resulting album had more of a house and new jack swing sound, which sold poorly, failed to find the new market for which it was aiming, and was poorly received by critics. Unwilling to compromise their creative input, unable to score another hit with the label's new sound, and with its youthful pop-rap style waning in popularity, L'Trimm disbanded.

Life after L'Trimm
Bunny D became a nurse working in the fields of Geriatrics, Labor and Delivery, and Special Needs Children and Adults. She has four children and was married to La Kidd from Philadelphia's Tuff Crew, whom she met while touring together, which released the 1989 hit "My Parta Town." Bunny is also writing a series of children's books and is designing a clothing line.

After a few years of hosting events in Miami's burgeoning music, arts, fashion, and club scenes in South Beach, Lady Tigra moved back to New York City, where she managed nightclubs. In 2008, she moved to Los Angeles and released her first solo project, Please Mr. Boombox (which featured a guest track by MC Lyte), to great critical review, and leading to popular site at the time, MySpace, putting the first track on their sign-in page as video of the month. Tigra wrote and performed the jingle on the Pinkberry website and appeared on the Nickelodeon children's show Yo Gabba Gabba, where she performed Debbie Deb's "When I Hear Music." In 2010, she collaborated with writer/director J.B. Ghuhman Jr. and music producer Yeti Beats on the soundtrack of the award-winning movie Spork, which incorporated many references to 1990s pop-culture.

In 2016, Lady Tigra appeared in the American documentary film 808. 

In 2018 Tigra appeared in the first episode of the second season of the Peabody Award-winning Netflix docuseries "Hip-Hop Evolution, The Southern Way."  Alongside acts such as Uncle Luke, Disco Rick, Trick Daddy, Brother Marquis, Mr. Mixx, The Geto Boys, and UGK.

In 2019 Lady Tigra began a collaboration with Spencer Nezey (Her Majesty and the Wolves, Jupiter Rising) called Tigra & Spencer, releasing their first single "Can't Walk Away" in December of the same year.

Lady Tigra remains active in New York, Miami, and LA's underground music, fashion, DJ, art and club scenes. 

L'Trimm has not released further material. Although the duo disbanded, they remain close friends, with Lady Tigra often referencing her days in L'Trimm with Bunny D. as one of her influences. In 2008, "Cars with the Boom" was ranked number 95 on VH1's 100 Greatest Songs of Hip Hop. In 2016, "Cars with the Boom" was ranked 100 in Rolling Stone'''s Top 100 Hip Hop Songs of all Time.

In 2019, L'Trimm appeared in the Boogaloo Shrimp documentary, a film about Michael Chambers, the American dancer and actor known as "Boogaloo Shrimp." Michael is most renowned for his role as "Turbo" in the 1984 cult movie Breakin’ and its sequel Breakin' 2: Electric Boogaloo.

In 2020, L'Trimm's song "Cars with the Boom" went viral on the social media app TikTok. On June 3, the compilation album Cars That Go Boom was released.

Discography
Albums
1988: Grab It! (Time-X/Hot Productions HTLP-3307/Atlantic 81925) (Gold)
1989: Drop That Bottom (Atlantic 82026)
1991: Groovy (Atlantic 82300)
2020: Cars That Go Boom (Warner Music group - X5 Music Group)

The Lady Tigra
2008: "Please Mr. BoomBox" (High Score Productions)

Singles
L'Trimm
1987: "Grab It"
1988: "Cutie Pie"
1988: "Cars That Go Boom"
1989: "Drop That Bottom"
1991: "Get Loose"
1991: "Low Rider"
The Lady Tigra Singles
2008: Bass on the Bottom (remixed by Mr. Hahn of Linkin Park) 
2009: Stole My Radio (featuring Mc Lyte)
2010: Santa Baby (by Yeti Beats featuring DJ IQ Luna of The Handroids)
2011: Summertime (featuring Fatlip from The Pharcyde)
2012: Thing-a-Ling (Spork Movie Soundtrack)
Guest Appearances by The Lady Tigra:
2001: Larry Tee - Supasize
2004: Avenue D + Phiiliip - Pants Down
2006: The Phenomenal Handclap Band - "15 to 20" ft. The Lady Tigra
2009: Jupiter Rising - When the Bass Drops
2012: Staygold - Backseat (featuring Spank Rock, Damian Adore and Lady Tigra)
2015: Ruckus Robiticus - Come Alive
2017: Oliver - Heart Attack (featuring De La Soul)
The Lady Tigra Prime Time TV
2008: Dirty Sexy Money featuring Alicia Keys: Switchblade Kitty
2009: The World According to Paris: Switchblade Kitty
2009: The Real World: Bass on the Bottom
2012: Misfits: 15 to 20
2016: Devious Maids: Player of Love

References

External links
Chart history (limited info; requires subscription) at Billboard''
L'Trimm Interview 1990 Slammin' Rap Video Magazine
Music video for "Cars That Go Boom" by L'Trimm

African-American musical groups
American hip hop groups
Women hip hop groups
American girl groups
Atlantic Records artists
Miami bass groups
Hip hop duos
American musical duos
Southern hip hop groups
Musical groups established in 1987
Musical groups disestablished in 1991
People from Kendall, Florida
American women rappers
African-American women rappers